C. africana may refer to:

 Chlamydoselachus africana, the southern African frilled shark, a shark species
 Clathrina africana, a sponge species
 Claviceps africana, a fungus sorghum pathogen species
 Cleopatra africana, a freshwater snail species
 Cnemaspis africana, a gecko species found in Central Africa
 Chrysomyza africana, a picture-winged fly species
 Constricta africana, a fungus species
 Cordia africana, a tree species
 Cunninghamella africana, a fungus species

Synonyms 
 Carissa africana, a synonym for Carissa spinarum, the conkerberry or bush plum, a large shrub species

See also 
 Africana (disambiguation)